The Oceania Table Tennis Championships is a biennial table tennis tournament held by Oceania Table Tennis Federation (OTTF). Between 1996 and 2010, the tournament was held in conjunction with Oceania Junior Table Tennis Championships. In 2012 and 2014, the men's singles and women's singles events were held as the ITTF-Oceania Cup, which is the sole qualification event for the prestigious ITTF World Cup.

Results

See also
 World Table Tennis Championships
 List of table tennis players

References

ITTF Statistics
Oceania Table Tennis Federation

 
Table tennis competitions
Table tennis in Oceania
Oceanian international sports competitions
Oceanian championships
Recurring sporting events established in 1978